Tectonatica sagraiana is a species of predatory sea snail, a marine gastropod mollusk in the family Naticidae, the moon snails.

Description
The shell size varies between 5 mm and 21 mm

Distribution
This species is distributed in the Mediterranean Sea and in the Atlantic Ocean along Madeira, the Canaries, Cape Verde and Angola.

References

 Gofas, S.; Afonso, J.P.; Brandào, M. (Ed.). (S.a.). Conchas e Moluscos de Angola = Coquillages et Mollusques d'Angola. [Shells and molluscs of Angola]. Universidade Agostinho / Elf Aquitaine Angola: Angola. 140 pp.
 Gofas, S.; Le Renard, J.; Bouchet, P. (2001). Mollusca, in: Costello, M.J. et al. (Ed.) (2001). European register of marine species: a check-list of the marine species in Europe and a bibliography of guides to their identification. Collection Patrimoines Naturels, 50: pp. 180–213
 Rolán E., 2005. Malacological Fauna From The Cape Verde Archipelago. Part 1, Polyplacophora and Gastropoda.
 Huelsken T., Marek K., Schreiber S., Schmidt I. & Hollmann M. (2008). The Naticidae (Mollusca: Gastropoda) of Giglio Island (Tuscany, Italy): Shell characters, live animals, and a molecular analysis of egg masses. Zootaxa 1770: 1-40

External links
 

Naticidae
Gastropods described in 1842
Molluscs of the Atlantic Ocean
Molluscs of the Mediterranean Sea
Molluscs of the Canary Islands
Gastropods of Cape Verde
Molluscs of Madeira
Molluscs of Angola